Andreas Hofer (ca. 1629 – 25 February 1684) was a German composer of the Baroque period.

Hofer was born at Reichenhall. He was a contemporary of Heinrich Ignaz Franz von Biber, whose predecessor he was in Salzburg in his office of Inspector and Hofkapellmeister, i.e., director of the court orchestra.  Like Biber, Hofer was noted for his large-scale polychoral sacred works. It has been suggested that Hofer was the composer of the famous Missa Salisburgensis à 53 voci, which earlier had been attributed to Orazio Benevoli, although it is now accepted that it was the work of Biber.

Hofer died at Salzburg.  His compositions contain significant roles for instruments like the cornetto, trombone or sackbut and trumpet.  Little of his music has been performed or recorded in recent times; several scores, however, have been made available.

Compositions
Missa Archi Episcopalis à 19: 8 Voci Concertati SSAA/TTBB, 2 Violini, 2 Viole, 2 Cornetti, 2 Trombettae ("Clarini"), 3 Tromboni, Organo con Violone (1668?)
Missa valete: SSATB, 2 Violini, 2 Viole, 2 Trombettae, 2 Cornetti, 3 Tromboni, Organo, Violone.
Dextera Domini à 17: SATB, SATB, 2 Cornetti, 3 Tromboni, 4 Viole da Braccia, Organo.
Fundata est Domus (De Dedicatione) à 12: SSATTB in concerto, SSATTB in ripieno, 2 Violini, 2 Viole, 2 Cornetti, Organo (with opening Sonata).
Gaudeamus exultemus à 15: SATB, SATB, 4 Viole da Braccia, 2 Cornetti, 3 Tromboni, Organo.
Estote fortes in bello à 15: SATB, SATB, 2 Violini, 2 Cornetti, 3 Tromboni, Organo
Dixit Dominus: SATB concertato & ripieno, SATB concertato & ripieno, 2 Violini o 2 Cornetti, 3 Viole o 3 Tromboni, Organo.
Magnificat à 17 (with Sonata): SATB, SATB, 4 Viole, 2 Cornetti, 3 Tromboni, Organo.
Te Deum laudamus à 23: SATB, SATB, 2 Violini, 2 Viole, 5 Trombettae, Timpani, 2 Cornetti, 3 Tromboni, Organo.

Available
Salmi e motetti: Laetatus sum, Magdeburg: Edition Walhall, 2008
Salmi e motetti: Nisi Dominus aedificaverit domus,  Magdeburg: Edition Walhall, 2007
 Salmi e motetti: Cum iucunditate cantemus, Magdeburg: Edition Walhall, 2007
Musikalische Vesper (recording), Kassel: Rainer Kahleyss, P 2007
Salmi e motetti:  Laudate pueri Dominum, Magdeburg: Edition Walhall, 2004
Salmi e motetti: Confitebor tibi Domine
Salmi e motetti: Nisi Dominus aedificaverit domum, Magdeburg: Edition Walhall 2004
Psalmen und Motetten (1654) / (selection) Lauda Jerusalem Dominum, Magdeburg: Edition Walhall, c 2004, Partitur, Stimmen
Nisi Dominus
Missa "Valete", Altötting: Alfred Coppenrath, c 1990
Te Deum, Vienna: Universal-Edition, 1980
Psalmi brevi, Vienna : Universal-Edition, 1979 c, 1. ed.

See also
Heinrich Ignaz Franz von Biber
Pavel Josef Vejvanovský
Johann Heinrich Schmelzer
Joannes Baptista Dolar
Johann Joseph Fux
Orazio Benevoli
Salzburg
Kroměříž
Reichenhall
Moravia
Polychoral
Colossal Baroque
Cornett
Cornettino
Natural trumpet
Trombone
Sackbut

References

Further reading
 M. W. Barndt-Webb, Andreas Hofer. His Life and Music. PhD thesis, University of Illinois, 1972.
 Ernst Hintermaier, Missa Salisburgensis. Neue Erkenntnisse über Entstehung,  und Zweckbestimmung, in: Musicologica Austriaca 1 (1977), .
 Jürg Stenzl, Ernst Hintermaier (ed.), Salzburger Musikgeschichte: vom Mittelalter bis ins 21. Jahrhundert  Salzburg-Munich : Pustet 2005, 
 Karl Weinmann, Andreas Hofer. In Archiv für Musikwissenschaft, vol I, 1918.
 Chris Woodstra, Gerald Brennan, Allen Schrott, All Music Guide to Classical Music: the definitive guide to classical music''  San Francisco, CA : Backbeat Books  2005

External links

1629 births
1684 deaths
German Baroque composers
German classical composers
People from Bad Reichenhall
17th-century classical composers
German male classical composers
17th-century male musicians